René Berthod (born 7 February 1948 in Château d'Oex, Switzerland) is a retired Swiss alpine skier who competed in the 1976 Winter Olympics. In 1978, after various injuries, Berthod announced his retirement from active ski racing.

External links
 sports-reference.com
 

1948 births
Living people
Swiss male alpine skiers
Olympic alpine skiers of Switzerland
Alpine skiers at the 1976 Winter Olympics
People from Château-d'Œx
Sportspeople from the canton of Vaud
20th-century Swiss people